Joseph Belcher (May 14, 1699 – April 27, 1723) was a minister at the First Church in Dedham, Massachusetts.

Personal life
Belcher was born on May 14, 1669, in Milton, Massachusetts and was graduated from Harvard College in 1690. After his parents separated, Belcher was raised by his maternal grandparents. His father died in 1678 and, in his will, directed that Belcher should become an apprentice to trade at the age of 14. As he approached that birthday, his grandmother died and left him a "considerable fortune," including 300 acres of land in Milton. She also left  him 10 acres of land in Dorchester along with a mill and mill rights. As a result, he was very nearly financially independent.

Belcher settled in Dedham on November 29, 1693. Soon after, he married Abigail Thompson. They had six children. His daughter married Joseph Richards. His son, Sir Joseph Belcher, was a Harvard graduate and a teacher in the Dedham Public Schools. Belcher was friends with Judge Samuel Sewall and Cotton Mather. Sewall attended his ordination.

In 1721 he came down with a "dangerous paralysis" and went to Roxbury to the home of his son-in-law, Rev. Thomas Walter. There he was cared for by his wife's brother, Dr. Philip Sampson. The church occasionally took up collections to support him during this time. He died in Roxbury on April 27, 1723, and five of the "principal men" of Dedham were appointed to hire a coach to transport his body back to Dedham. The town appropriated 40 pounds to cover the expenses of his funeral and £2.4s for the "entertainment" of the men who attended his funeral and their horses. He is buried in the Old Village Cemetery. Cotton Mather read a eulogy of him in Boston.

Ministry
He first preached in Dedham on April 17, 1692, and then again for the second time a month later on May 15. He received 15 shillings per day as a guest speaker. The records of May 23, 1692 Town Meeting indicate that "the Ch and Town have given a call" to have Belcher move to Dedham and serve as the minister. Belcher returned to preach on June 12 and did so regularly beginning on October 30. Church records indicate the call was given on December 4, 1692.

Belcher was shy and self-effacing, and had a "calming influence, rational approach and generally non-inflammatory attitude." It was likely his calm approach that saved Dedham from being caught up in the hysteria surrounding the witch trials in Salem and surrounding communities.

He was minister at the First Church and Parish in Dedham from 1693 until 1723, although illness prevented him from preaching after 1721.  His portrait, donated in 1839, hangs just left of First Church's pulpit.

Five of his sermons survive. One was delivered before the Great and General Court, one before the Ancient and Honorable Artillery Company, two preached in Dedham specifically for young people, and one at the ordination of Nathaniel Cotton in Bristol, Rhode Island.

Salary
A few weeks after settling, on December 23, Town Meeting voted to set his salary at 60 pounds a year. In 1696, he tried to return to a system of voluntary contributions instead of the taxes imposes to pay the salary of his predecessor, but when that system failed the tax was reimposed in 1704. By the end of his tenure his salary was 100 pounds a year plus the firewood provided by members of the parish. The town also contributed 60 pounds to build a parsonage on land now owned by the Allin Congregational Church.

Notes

References

Works cited

External links

American clergy
Clergy from Dedham, Massachusetts
People from Milton, Massachusetts
1724 deaths
1669 births
Harvard College alumni
Burials at Old Village Cemetery
People from colonial Dedham, Massachusetts